Frankie Jones may refer to:

 Frankie Jones (reggae singer), 1970s/1980s Jamaican singer, also known as Jah Frankie Jones
 Frankie Jones (boxer) (1933–1991), Scottish flyweight/bantamweight boxer
 Frankie Jones (gymnast) (born 1990), Welsh Olympic gymnast
 Frankie Lee (musician) (1941–2015), American soul blues singer-songwriter, born Frankie Lee Jones